List of hospitals in Washington may refer to:

 List of hospitals in Washington (state)
 List of hospitals in Washington, D.C.